WCBM (680 kHz) is a commercial AM radio station in Baltimore, Maryland.  It is owned by WCBM Maryland, Inc., and broadcasts a talk radio format, calling itself "Talk Radio 680 WCBM."  The radio studios and offices are on York Road in Lutherville, off the Baltimore Beltway (Interstate 695).

By day, WCBM transmits 50,000 watts, the maximum for commercial AM stations; but to protect other stations on 680 AM, at night it reduces power to 20,000 watts.  It uses a directional antenna at all times, with a six-tower array.  The transmitter is off Marriottsville Road in Randallstown.  Programming is also heard on 220-watt FM translator W260BV at 99.9 MHz in Aberdeen, Maryland.

History

Early Years
WCBM first signed on the air in 1924.  The original studios were in the Hotel Chateau, located at the northwest corner of Charles Street and North Avenue. The call letters - Chateau Baltimore Maryland, are derived from the hotel's name. The Chateau was also home to the drugstore where Dr. George Bunting first produced and marketed the skin cream Noxzema.

In the 1930s, WCBM had moved to the Hearst Tower Building in Baltimore.  It broadcast on 1370 kilocycles but was only transmitted 500 watts by day, 250 watts at night, while competitor WBAL ran 50,000 watts. WCBM was the NBC Blue Network affiliate for Baltimore, carrying its dramas, comedies, news and sports, during the "Golden Age of Radio."  The Blue Network later became ABC.

Move to 680 AM
WCBM moved several times on the dial.  With the 1941 enactment of the North American Regional Broadcasting Agreement (NARBA), it switched from 1350 to 1400.  In 1949, it relocated to its current frequency: 680 kHz, which allowed WCBM to increase its power to 10,000 watts in the daytime and 5,000 watts at night.  As network programming shifted from radio to television in the 1950s, WCBM gradually became a full service, middle of the road music and personality station.

In 1960 WCBM added an FM station.  WCBM-FM broadcast at 106.5 MHz, simulcasting the AM station.  It was sold to the owner of Channel 2 WMAR-TV in 1968, becoming WMAR-FM and today is WWMX, owned by Audacy.

Metromedia Ownership
WCBM-AM-FM were sold in 1963 to Metromedia, a large New York City-based broadcasting company. Metromedia also owned WTTG—Washington, D.C.; WNEW, WNEW-FM and WNEW-TV—New York City; WHK and WHK-FM—Cleveland; and WIP and WIP-FM—Philadelphia. The studios were moved to Owings Mills, Maryland.

Metromedia helped WCBM establish a reputation for radio news reporting. It affiliated WCBM with CBS Radio News and maintained a staff of professional reporters and anchors.  An advertisement in the 1964 Broadcasting Yearbook said WCBM airs 32 hours of news each week. "WCBM listeners hear it first!  WCBM legmen are first on the scene, in Baltimore, surrounding counties and at the state capital of Annapolis."

But WCBM had a hard time competing with Hearst Corporation-owned WBAL, which also had a large news-gathering staff, as well as a powerful 50,000-watt signal.  By the 1970s, WCBM evolved into more of an Adult Contemporary music format.

Switch to All-Talk
In 1981, WCBM began running talk programming in the evening, while keeping its music and news in the daytime.  As fewer people listened to music on AM radio, WCBM evolved to all talk by 1983.  It was also the flagship radio station of the Baltimore Colts football team.  Chuck Thompson and Vince Bagli called the action in the broadcast booth.

The station was sold in 1987 to local owners using the corporate name "Magic 680 Inc."  WCBM returned to an adult contemporary format, dropping talk abruptly.  After several months, it began playing oldies music, with a playlist of  hits from 1955 to 1969.  In 1987, when the radio broadcast rights for the Baltimore Orioles baseball team became available, WCBM surprisingly outbid both WBAL and WFBR which had been the radio home of the Orioles for the previous eight years.  Considered to be a major coup at the time, WCBM's tenure as the Orioles flagship lasted only one season, as the station faced severe financial difficulties. By 1988, WCBM had filed Chapter 11 bankruptcy, went dark soon after, and was put up for sale.

Rescue from Bankruptcy
At about the same time that WCBM was in the middle of bankruptcy, rival AM station 1300 WFBR was sold in 1988 and changed its format from news/talk to 1950s' rock & roll.  With the format flip, WFBR let go most of the station's talk show hosts that summer. In October 1988, WCBM was bought by Baltimore area businessman and philanthropist Nick Mangione, Sr. who resurrected it from bankruptcy. A World War II veteran, Mangione was an avid listener of talk radio and a fan of WFBR's former talk radio format. Once he acquired the station, Mangione brought most of WFBR's former talk radio line-up to WCBM, including Frank Luber, Joe Lombardo, Tom Marr, Ken Maylath, Les Kinsolving and Stan "The Fan" Charles.

WCBM originally had The Rush Limbaugh Show on its weekday schedule in the early 1990s, but lost it to competitor 1090 WBAL in 1994.  With its stronger signal and higher ratings, Limbaugh's syndicator put the program on WBAL.  At the time, WCBM was broadcasting at 10,000 watts by day and 5,000 watts night.  WCBM had to scramble to replace Limbaugh in the Noon to 3 p.m. slot, choosing Zoh Heironimus to fill the role.  Despite having a following, Zoh Heironimus didn't capture the listeners as well as Limbaugh.  So WCBM added Dr. Laura Schlessinger to the 12–3 spot but her ratings dropped further.  After WJFK (1300 AM) discontinued his program, WCBM added the syndicated G. Gordon Liddy Show. Liddy improved the ratings numbers for WCBM, although was not as successful as Limbaugh.  By the end of 2001, The Sean Hannity Show was added to the 3–6 p.m. time slot, replacing Bob Scherr.

Power Boost
In 2001, WCBM completed construction on a new six-tower transmitter array in Randallstown, Maryland.  WCBM went to a daytime power of 50,000 watts in 2004.  The nighttime power increased to 20,000 watts.  At the end of his contract with WBAL, on July 1, 2006, Limbaugh returned to WCBM.  WBAL did not renew its contract with Premiere Networks due to the high cost.  The station decided to go with a local host and use the extra money to win back the broadcast rights to the Baltimore Orioles and to go after the rights to the Baltimore Ravens football team. Limbaugh's show replaced G. Gordon Liddy in the early afternoon time slot. The Mark Levin Show, syndicated by Westwood One, debuted on the same day as Limbaugh's return, airing from 7 to 9 p.m.

In 2009, WCBM dropped the ABC News Radio Network and switched to Fox News Radio for its world and national news coverage.  This change coincided with competitor 1090 WBAL's change to an all news morning show.  For both WCBM and WBAL, new station sweepers, imaging, station ID's and music accompanied the changes in programming.  WCBM's imaging now centers on its affiliation with Fox News. During the end of 2020, WCBM changed national news affiliation from Fox News to Townhall News, part of the Salem Radio Network.

Popular Personalities
On October 31, 2019, veteran personality Frank Luber retired after 31 years with WCBM, 27 of them hosting "Maryland's Wake Up Call."  Luber's co-host, Sean Casey, was teamed with former late morning host Bruce Elliott for "The Morning Drive with Casey & Elliott."  Derek Hunter, formerly of 1090 WBAL, took Elliott's time slot, 9 to 11:45 a.m. Derek Hunter has been with WCBM since 2019.

With the death of syndicated host Rush Limbaugh in February 2021, WCBM management decided to replace his popular early afternoon show with local programming.  Derek Hunter was moved to Limbaugh's early afternoon time slot, with Elliott relocated to late mornings and Casey remaining as the wake-up host.

Programming
Weekdays on WCBM, local hosts are heard from 6 a.m. to 3 p.m.  The morning drive time show is "Casey and Company" with Sean Casey.  He's followed by Bruce Elliott and Bill O'Reilly's 15-minute commentary.  In early afternoons, Derek Hunter is heard.  The rest of the schedule is made up of nationally syndicated shows: Sean Hannity, Mark Levin, Dan Bongino, "Coast to Coast AM with George Noory" and Todd Starnes.

Weekends feature shows on money, health, gardening, cars, movies, technology, travel, veterans affairs, real estate and religion.  They include "The Money Pit Home Improvement Radio Show," "The Lutheran Hour," "The RM Travel Show with Rudy Maxa" and Kim Komando.  Some weekend shows are paid brokered programming.  Most hours begin with world and national news from Townhall News.

The sister station for WCBM, WQLL, is currently in an LMA (Licensed Marketing Agreement with iHeartMedia) agreement broadcasting BIN (Black Information Network).

References

External links

FCC History Cards for WCBM

News and talk radio stations in the United States
Metromedia
CBM
Randallstown, Maryland
Radio stations established in 1924
1924 establishments in Maryland